Prior to qualifying as host nation, Qatar had never qualified the FIFA World Cup since the country's independence in 1971. While Qatar has been a regular participant in the continental AFC Asian Cup, the national side has always fallen short in the final stage of World Cup campaigns. By hosting the 2022 FIFA World Cup and its failure to qualify for the 2018 FIFA World Cup held in Russia, Qatar became the only nation to play in World Cup without qualifying for it and the second nation after Italy (back in 1934) to qualifying for the World Cup as hosts after being absent in all previous World Cup before.

Previous disgraced President of FIFA, Sepp Blatter, awarded the hosting rights of 2022 World Cup to Qatar, which prompted multiple controversies around him, the decision and the tournament itself. Qatar faced criticism over working conditions of migrant workers and LGBTIQ+ rights while also being accused of bribing multiple FIFA  officials to host the tournament, which is denied by Qatar. In 2022, just before the tournament kicked off, Blatter stated that awarding the tournament to Qatar was a "mistake". He remarked that the nation is "too small of a country" to host the tournament and that "football and the World Cup are too big for it". Since 2017, the Qatari government has introduced reforms aimed at improving conditions for migrant workers. In January 2022, FIFA president Gianni Infantino acknowledged the country's amendments in work legislation, protection of workers and minimum wage while addressing more alterations to be made. 

Qatar's national team showed some improvement in their performance since the country was awarded the tournament, including winning the 2019 AFC Asian Cup, and in 2019 Copa América drew against former champions and World Cup quarter-finalists Paraguay with 2-2. 

At rank 50, Qatar entered the tournament as the third lowest ranked team of the total 32; placing higher only above Saudi Arabia and Ghana. The nation performed poorly and set some upsetting records among host nations in the process. Qatar became the first host nation to lose not only its opening match, but also all three of its matches. Upon losing the second match against Senegal with a score of 3-1, Qatar became the first host nation to be eliminated from the tournament in two matches after the Netherlands later on drew with Ecuador (putting both with four points, Senegal with three and Qatar with zero). Qatar also finished last in their group by failing to secure any point, making them the first host nation to have 0 points at the end of the group stage. The nation thereby became the worst performing host nation in the history of the tournament, overtaking South Africa, who had finished third in their group with 4 points and were eliminated based on goal difference.

FIFA World Cup record

By match

Qatar 2022

Group stage

Record players

Matches

Top goalscorers

See also
Qatar at the AFC Asian Cup

References

 
Countries at the FIFA World Cup